Events in the year 1999 in Burkina Faso.

Incumbents 

 President: Blaise Compaoré
 Prime Minister: Kadré Désiré Ouédraogo

Events 

 June – A general strike is held to protest government economic policies and alleged human rights violations.

Deaths

References 

 
1990s in Burkina Faso
Years of the 20th century in Burkina Faso
Burkina Faso
Burkina Faso